Edward Joseph "Spider" Mazur (July 25, 1929 – July 3, 1995) was a Canadian ice hockey forward. He played in the National Hockey League with the Montreal Canadiens and Chicago Black Hawks between 1951 and 1956. The rest of his career, which lasted from 1948 to 1966, was spent in the minor leagues.

Playing career
Mazur started his National Hockey League career with the Montreal Canadiens in 1951. He played in the 1951, 1952 and 1953 playoffs for the Canadiens prior to ever playing a regular season game in the NHL.  He became the first player in NHL history to score four playoff goals prior to playing a regular season game. Chris Kreider of the New York Rangers exceeded that mark with five goals in the 2012 postseason.  He would also play with the Chicago Black Hawks. He would leave the NHL after the 1957 season. He retired from hockey in 1965. He won the Stanley Cup in 1953 with the Montreal Canadiens.  EDDIE MAZUR also played for the VICTORIA COUGARS in the Western League.  As

Career statistics

Regular season and playoffs

Awards and achievements
Turnbull Cup MJHL Championship (1948)
PCHL Northern Second All-Star Team (1950)
PCHL Second All-Star Team (1951)
PCHL Championship (1951)
Stanley Cup Championship (1953)
AHL Second All-Star Team (1957 & 1959)
Played in NHL All-Star Game (1953)
WHL Championship (1956)
Inducted into the Manitoba Sports Hall of Fame and Museum in 1995
Honoured Member of the Manitoba Hockey Hall of Fame

References

External links
 
Eddie Mazur’s biography at Manitoba Sports Hall of Fame and Museum
Eddie Mazur's biography at Manitoba Hockey Hall of Fame

1929 births
1995 deaths
Buffalo Bisons (AHL) players
Canadian ice hockey forwards
Chicago Blackhawks players
Cleveland Barons (1937–1973) players
Dallas Texans (USHL) players
Montreal Canadiens players
Montreal Royals (QSHL) players
Providence Reds players
Rochester Americans players
Ice hockey people from Winnipeg
Stanley Cup champions
Winnipeg Monarchs players
Winnipeg Warriors (minor pro) players
Vancouver Canucks (WHL) players
Victoria Maple Leafs players